The rough sand frog (Tomopterna tuberculosa) is a species of frog in the family Pyxicephalidae.
It is found in Angola, the Democratic Republic of the Congo, Namibia, Tanzania, Zambia, and Zimbabwe, and possibly Malawi and Mozambique.
Its natural habitats are dry savanna, moist savanna, freshwater marshes, and intermittent freshwater marshes.

References

Tomopterna
Amphibians described in 1882
Taxonomy articles created by Polbot